Molannodes is a genus of insects belonging to the family Molannidae.

The species of this genus are found in Europe, Far East Russia and Northern America.

Species:
 Molannodes alticola (Malicky & Chantaramongkol, 1996) 
 Molannodes decurvatus (Wiggins, 1968)

References

Integripalpia
Trichoptera genera